Robert Blakeney (c. 1724 – 30 December 1762) was an Irish Member of Parliament.

He was born the son of John Blakeney and Grace Persse and was the brother of Theophilus, John and William Blakeney.

He sat in the Irish House of Commons for Athenry from 1747 to his death. He served as High Sheriff of County Galway in 1754.

He married Gertrude Blakeney, daughter of Major Robert Blakeney on 28 May 1752. Their son John Blakeney also later sat as an MP for the borough.

References

External links
  

1720s births
1762 deaths
Politicians from County Galway
Irish MPs 1727–1760
Irish MPs 1761–1768
High Sheriffs of County Galway
Members of the Parliament of Ireland (pre-1801) for County Galway constituencies